The Control of Substances Hazardous to Health Regulations 2002 is a United Kingdom Statutory Instrument which states general requirements imposed on employers to protect employees and other persons from the hazards of substances used at work by risk assessment, control of exposure, health surveillance and incident planning. There are also duties on employees to take care of their own exposure to hazardous substances and prohibitions on the import of certain substances into the European Economic Area. The regulations reenacted, with amendments, the Control of Substances Hazardous to Work Regulations 1999 and implement several European Union directives.

Breach of the regulations by an employer or employee is a crime, punishable on summary conviction or on indictment  by an unlimited fine. Either an individual or a corporation can be punished and sentencing practice is published by the Sentencing Council. Enforcement is the responsibility of the Health and Safety Executive or in some cases, local authorities.

The regulations are complementary to the Chemicals (Hazard Information and Packaging for Supply) Regulations 2002 (CHIPS) and the CLP Regulation which require labelling of hazardous substances by suppliers. There are other regulations concerning the labelling and signage of pipes and containers (Sch.7), and since 2008 a further level of control mechanism on dangerous chemicals was added by the EU regulation on Registration, Evaluation, Authorisation and Restriction of Chemicals (REACH).

The Control of Substances Hazardous to Health (COSHH) regulations have been in place for more than 25 years  and the scientific evidence suggests that over this time industry has, in general, been consistently reducing exposure to hazardous substances.

European Legislation implemented
The regulations implement the following European Union (EU) directives:
Council directive 78/610/EEC, on the approximation of the laws, regulations and administrative provisions of EU member states on the protection of the health of workers exposed to vinyl chloride monomer;
Council Directive 89/677/EEC, art.1(3) the importation, supply or use of benzene and substances containing benzene, amending the Marketing and Use Directive, 76/796/EEC;
In part, Commission directive 96/55/EC, the second adaptation to technical progress of the Marketing and Use Directive;
Individual directives under 89/391/EEC, Art.16(1):
Council Directive 90/394/EEC, on the protection of workers from risks related to exposure to carcinogens at work, insofar as it relates to carcinogens other than asbestos;
Council Directive 98/24/EC, on the protection of the health and safety of workers from risks related to chemical agents at work, insofar as it relates to risks to health from exposure to substances other than asbestos or lead; and
European Parliament and Council Directive 2000/54/EC, on the protection of workers from risks related to exposure to biological agents at work.

The regulations are consistent with Commission Directive 91/322/EEC requirements on indicative limit values.

Prohibited substances

Import prohibited
Import is prohibited into the UK, other than from another EU member state or member of the European Economic Area, of (reg.4(2)):
2-naphthylamine, benzidine, 4-aminodiphenyl, 4-nitrodiphenyl, their salts and any substance containing any of those compounds in a total concentration equal to or greater than 0.1% by mass;
Matches made with white phosphorus.
Contravention is an offence under the Customs and Excise Management Act 1979 rather than health and safety regulations.

Supply prohibited
Supply is prohibited, during the course of work or for use at work, of (reg.4(3), (4)/ Sch.2, item.11):
Any of the substances whose import is prohibited;
Benzene and any substance containing benzene in a concentration equal to or greater than 0.1% by mass, but excluding:
Motor fuels covered by Council Directive 85/210/EEC;
Waste covered by Council Directive 75/442/EEC.

Prohibited for specified purposes
Use of the following substances is prohibited for the purposes specified (reg.4(1)/ Sch.2):

Exceptions
The following are excluded from the operation of regulations 6 to 13 concerning the general process for management and control of hazardous substances (reg.5):
Circumstances covered by the:
Coal Mines (Respirable Dust) Regulations 1975;
Control of Lead at Work Regulations 2002;
Control of Asbestos Regulations 2012;
Substances hazardous to health solely by virtue of their radioactive, explosive or flammable properties, or solely because they are at high or low temperature or high pressure;
Risks arising solely from medical or dental treatment.

Requirements

Risk assessment
Regulation 6 requires that an employer should not carry out work liable to expose employees and non-employees, such as members of the public to a substance hazardous to health without a risk assessment and implementation of the steps necessary to comply with the regulations. The assessment must include consideration of any information provided by the supplier of a substance (CHIPS) (reg.6(2)(b)) and must be reviewed regularly, and also when there is reason to think the assessment is no longer valid, if the system of work is changed or if necessary because of the results of health monitoring (reg.6(3)). The assessment must also consider any occupational exposure limit, in particular, those mandated by the HSE (reg.6(2)(f)) or by the workplace activities

Prevention or control of exposure
Regulation 7 requires that an employer prevent exposure to hazardous substances or, if this is not reasonably practicable, that they adequately control exposure.
One of the main points of the COSHH risk assessment is to identify the measures that are to be used to avoid a hazard or reduce the level of risk associated with a hazard. Employers must ensure that exposure to hazardous substances is prevented or, if this is not reasonably practicable, adequately controlled. Ideally, this will mean preventing exposure by:

 removing hazardous substance, by changing the process;
 substituting it with a safe or safer substance, or using it in a safer form.
Where this is not reasonably practicable, controlling exposure by, for example:
 totally enclosing the process (such as a shot-blasting box);
 using partial enclosure and/or extraction equipment (such as a spray painting booth);
 general ventilation;
 using safe systems of work and handling procedures (written procedures, etc.).
It is for the employer to decide on the method of controlling exposure. The regulations, however, limit the use of personal protective equipment (e.g. respirators, dust marks, protective clothing), as the means of protection to only those situations where other measures cannot adequately control exposure.

Use of control measures
Employers must take all reasonable steps to ensure that control measures, and any necessary equipment of facilities, are properly used or applied (reg.8(1)). Employees must use the control measures properly, return them after use and report any defective equipment (reg.8(2)).

Maintenance and testing of control measures
Regulation 9 requires that employers maintain control measures in efficient working order and in good repair, with thorough examination and testing of local exhaust ventilation plant generally every 14 months, and for other controls "at suitable intervals".

Monitoring exposure
Where the risk assessment indicates that workplace monitoring of exposure is necessary, the employer must perform such monitoring unless they can demonstrate another means of preventing or controlling exposure (reg.10). Monitoring must be at regular intervals in addition to when a change occurs that may affect exposure (reg.10(3)). There is mandatory monitoring for (reg.10(4)):

Health surveillance
Regulation 11 requires that health surveillance of employees is carried out where:
An identifiable disease or adverse health effect may be related to the exposure;
There is a "reasonable likelihood" that the disease or health effect may occur under the particular conditions of work;
Valid techniques exist for detecting indications of the disease of health effect; and
The technique presents a low risk to the employee;
— or where there is exposure to any of the following substances in the specified occupations:

Information, instruction and training
Regulation 12 demands that all employees liable to exposure to hazardous substances are provided with suitable and sufficient information, instruction and training, including:
Details of the hazardous substances including:
Names of substances and the risk that they present to health;
Any relevant occupational exposure standard, maximum exposure limit or similar occupational exposure limit;
Access to any relevant safety data sheet;
Other legislative provisions which concern the hazardous properties of those substances;
Significant findings of risk assessment;
Appropriate precautions and actions to be taken by the employee in order to safeguard himself and other employees at the workplace;
Results of any monitoring of exposure and, in particular, in the case of a substance hazardous to health for which a maximum exposure limit has been approved, the employee or his representatives shall be informed forthwith, if the results of such monitoring show that the maximum exposure limit has been exceeded; and
Collective results of any health surveillance undertaken in a form calculated to prevent those results from being identified as relating to a particular person.

Some biological agents can cause severe human disease and be a serious hazard to employees. Further diseases may be likely to spread to the community and there may be no effective prophylaxis or treatment available. Where employees are working with such an agent, or material that may contain such an agent, they must be provided with written instructions and, if appropriate, notices must be displayed that outline the procedures for handling such an agent or material.

Accidents, incidents and emergencies
Regulation 13 requires that employers prepare for possible accidents, incidents and emergencies involving hazardous substances by:
Preparing emergency procedures, including provision of first aid;
Making available technical information on possible accidents and hazards and bringing it to the attention of the emergency services; and
Installing alarms and other warnings and communication systems.

Fumigation
Regulation 14 requires that appropriate warning notices are affixed to premises that are to be fumigated with hydrogen cyanide, phosphine or methyl bromide. In most cases, notice must be given to any harbour authority in whose area the fumigation is to take place.

Exemptions
The HSE may issue certificates of exemption to certain employers so long as they are satisfied that the health and safety of workers will not be compromised (reg.15). The Secretary of State for Defence may issue certificates of exemption on the grounds of national security to the UK and visiting armed forces (reg.16).

Record keeping
An employer with five or more employees must record the results of the risk assessment (reg.6(4)).

Regulations on labelling of containers and pipes
Chemicals (Hazard Information and Packaging for Supply) Regulations 2002 (CHIP)(SI 2002/1689);
Health and Safety (Safety Signs and Signals) Regulations 1996 (SI 1996/341);
Radioactive Material (Road Transport) Regulations 2002 (SI 2002/1093);
Carriage of Dangerous Goods by Rail Regulations 1996 (SI 1996/2089);
Packaging, Labelling and Carriage of Radioactive Material by Rail Regulations 2002 (SI 2002/2099);
Carriage of Dangerous Goods (Classification, Packaging and Labelling) and Use of Transportable Pressure Receptacles Regulations 1996 (SI 1996/2092);
Carriage of Explosives by Road Regulations 1996 (SI 1996/2093);
Carriage of Dangerous Goods by Road Regulations 1996 (SI 1996/2095); and
Good Laboratory Practice Regulations 1999 (SI 1999/3106).
 Acetylene Regulations 2014

References

Bibliography

External links
COSHH information from the Health and Safety Executive
EH40/2005 Workplace exposure limits
Chemical Considerations

Statutory Instruments of the United Kingdom
2002 in British law
Health and safety in the United Kingdom
Regulation of chemicals in the United Kingdom
United Kingdom tort law
English criminal law
United Kingdom labour law